A Man of Action is a 1923 American comedy film directed by James W. Horne and written by Bradley King. The film stars Douglas MacLean, Marguerite De La Motte, Raymond Hatton, Wade Boteler, Arthur Millett, and Kingsley Benedict. The film was released on June 3, 1923, by Associated First National Pictures.

Cast
Douglas MacLean as Bruce MacAllister
Marguerite De La Motte as Helen Sumner
Raymond Hatton as Harry Hopwood
Wade Boteler as Spike McNab
Arthur Millett as Dr. Sumner
Kingsley Benedict as Andy
Arthur Stuart Hull as Eugene Preston
William Courtright as The 'Deacon'
Katherine Lewis as 'Frisco' Rose

References

External links

1923 films
1920s English-language films
Silent American comedy films
1923 comedy films
First National Pictures films
Films directed by James W. Horne
American silent feature films
American black-and-white films
1920s American films